In mathematics, a metric space is a set together with a notion of distance between its elements, usually called points.  The distance is measured by a function called a metric or distance function.  Metric spaces are the most general setting for studying many of the concepts of mathematical analysis and geometry.

The most familiar example of a metric space is 3-dimensional Euclidean space with its usual notion of distance.  Other well-known examples are a sphere equipped with the angular distance and the hyperbolic plane.  A metric may correspond to a metaphorical, rather than physical, notion of distance: for example, the set of 100-character Unicode strings can be equipped with the Hamming distance, which measures the number of characters that need to be changed to get from one string to another.

Since they are very general, metric spaces are a tool used in many different branches of mathematics.  Many types of mathematical objects have a natural notion of distance and therefore admit the structure of a metric space, including Riemannian manifolds, normed vector spaces, and graphs.  In abstract algebra, the p-adic numbers arise as elements of the completion of a metric structure on the rational numbers.  Metric spaces are also studied in their own right in metric geometry and analysis on metric spaces.

Many of the basic notions of mathematical analysis, including balls, completeness, as well as uniform, Lipschitz, and Hölder continuity, can be defined in the setting of metric spaces.  Other notions, such as continuity, compactness, and open and closed sets, can be defined for metric spaces, but also in the even more general setting of topological spaces.

Definition and illustration

Motivation 

To see the utility of different notions of distance, consider the surface of the Earth as a set of points.  We can measure the distance between two such points by the length of the shortest path along the surface, "as the crow flies"; this is particularly useful for shipping and aviation.  We can also measure the straight-line distance between two points through the Earth's interior; this notion is, for example, natural in seismology, since it roughly corresponds to the length of time it takes for seismic waves to travel between those two points.

The notion of distance encoded by the metric space axioms has relatively few requirements.  This generality gives metric spaces a lot of flexibility.  At the same time, the notion is strong enough to encode many intuitive facts about what distance means.  This means that general results about metric spaces can be applied in many different contexts.

Like many fundamental mathematical concepts, the metric on a metric space can be interpreted in many different ways.  A particular metric may not be best thought of as measuring physical distance, but, instead, as the cost of changing from one state to another (as with Wasserstein metrics on spaces of measures) or the degree of difference between two objects (for example, the Hamming distance between two strings of characters, or the Gromov–Hausdorff distance between metric spaces themselves).

Definition 

satisfying the following axioms for all points :
 The distance from a point to itself is zero:   Intuitively, it never costs anything to travel from a point to itself.
 (Positivity) The distance between two distinct points is always positive: 

If the metric  is unambiguous, one often refers by abuse of notation to "the metric space ".

Simple examples

The real numbers
The real numbers with the distance function  given by the absolute difference form a metric space.  Many properties of metric spaces and functions between them are generalizations of concepts in real analysis and coincide with those concepts when applied to the real line.

Metrics on Euclidean spaces
The Euclidean plane  can be equipped with many different metrics.  The Euclidean distance familiar from school mathematics can be defined by

The taxicab or Manhattan distance is defined by

and can be thought of as the distance you need to travel along horizontal and vertical lines to get from one point to the other, as illustrated at the top of the article.

The maximum, or Chebyshev distance is defined by

This distance doesn't have an easy explanation in terms of paths in the plane, but it still satisfies the metric space axioms.

In fact, these three distances, while they have distinct properties, are similar in some ways.  Informally, points that are close in one are close in the others, too.  This observation can be quantified with the formula

which holds for every pair of points .

A radically different distance can be defined by setting

In this discrete metric, all distinct points are 1 unit apart: none of them are close to each other, and none of them are very far away from each other either.  Intuitively, the discrete metric no longer remembers that the set is a plane, but treats it just as an undifferentiated set of points.

Subspaces

Two more useful examples are the open interval  and the closed interval  thought of as subspaces of the real line.

History 

In 1906 Maurice Fréchet introduced metric spaces in his work Sur quelques points du calcul fonctionnel in the context of functional analysis: his main interest was in studying the real-valued functions from a metric space, generalizing the theory of functions of several or even infinitely many variables, as pioneered by mathematicians such as Cesare Arzelà.  The idea was further developed and placed in its proper context by Felix Hausdorff in his magnum opus Principles of Set Theory, which also introduced the notion of a (Hausdorff) topological space.

General metric spaces have become a foundational part of the mathematical curriculum.  Prominent examples of metric spaces in mathematical research include Riemannian manifolds and normed vector spaces, which are the domain of differential geometry and functional analysis, respectively. Fractal geometry is a source of some exotic metric spaces.  Others have arisen as limits through the study of discrete or smooth objects, including scale-invariant limits in statistical physics, Alexandrov spaces arising as Gromov–Hausdorff limits of sequences of Riemannian manifolds, and boundaries and asymptotic cones in geometric group theory.  Finally, many new applications of finite and discrete metric spaces have arisen in computer science.

Basic notions
A distance function is enough to define notions of closeness and convergence that were first developed in real analysis.  Properties that depend on the structure of a metric space are referred to as metric properties.  Every metric space is also a topological space, and some metric properties can also be rephrased without reference to distance in the language of topology; that is, they are really topological properties.

The topology of a metric space

An open set is a set which is a neighborhood of all its points. As in any topology, closed sets are the complements of open sets. Sets may be both open and closed as well as neither open nor closed.

This topology does not carry all the information about the metric space. Similarly,  with the Euclidean metric and its subspace the interval  with the induced metric are homeomorphic but have very different metric properties.

Conversely, not every topological space can be given a metric.  Topological spaces which are compatible with a metric are called metrizable and are particularly well-behaved in many ways: in particular, they are paracompact Hausdorff spaces (hence normal) and first-countable.  The Nagata–Smirnov metrization theorem gives a characterization of metrizability in terms of other topological properties, without reference to metrics.

Convergence
Convergence of sequences in Euclidean space is defined as follows:
 A sequence  converges to a point  if for every  there is an integer  such that for all , .
Convergence of sequences in a topological space is defined as follows:
 A sequence  converges to a point  if for every open set  containing  there is an integer  such that for all , .
In metric spaces, both of these definitions make sense and they are equivalent.  This is a general pattern for topological properties of metric spaces: while they can be defined in a purely topological way, there is often a way that uses the metric which is easier to state or more familiar from real analysis.

Completeness

Informally, a metric space is complete if it has no "missing points": every sequence that looks like it should converge to something actually converges.

To make this precise: a sequence  in a metric space  is Cauchy if for every  there is an integer  such that for all , . If the converse is true—every Cauchy sequence in  converges—then  is complete.

These examples show that completeness is not a topological property, since  is complete but the homeomorphic space  is not.

This notion of "missing points" can be made precise. In fact, every metric space has a unique completion, which is a complete space that contains the given space as a dense subset.

Since complete spaces are generally easier to work with, completions are important throughout mathematics.  For example, in abstract algebra, the p-adic numbers are defined as the completion of the rationals under a different metric.  Completion is particularly common as a tool in functional analysis.  Often one has a set of nice functions and a way of measuring distances between them.  Taking the completion of this metric space gives a new set of functions which may be less nice, but nevertheless useful because they behave similarly to the original nice functions in important ways.  For example, weak solutions to differential equations typically live in a completion (a Sobolev space) rather than the original space of nice functions for which the differential equation actually makes sense.

Bounded and totally bounded spaces

Every totally bounded space is bounded. To see this, start with a finite cover by -balls for some arbitrary . Since the subset of  consisting of the centers of these balls is finite, it has finite diameter, say . By the triangle inequality, the diameter of the whole space is at most .

Compactness

Compactness is a topological property which generalizes the properties of a closed and bounded subset of Euclidean space.  There are several equivalent definitions of compactness in metric spaces:
 A metric space  is compact if every open cover has a finite subcover (the usual topological definition).
 A metric space  is compact if every sequence has a convergent subsequence.  (For general topological spaces this is called sequential compactness and is not equivalent to compactness.)
 A metric space  is compact if it is complete and totally bounded.  (This definition is written in terms of metric properties and doesn't make sense for a general topological space, but it is nevertheless topologically invariant since it is equivalent to compactness.)
One example of a compact space is the closed interval .

Compactness is important for similar reasons to completeness: it makes it easy to find limits.  Another important tool is Lebesgue's number lemma, which shows that for any open cover of a compact space, every point is relatively deep inside one of the sets of the cover.

Functions between metric spaces

Unlike in the case of topological spaces or algebraic structures such as groups or rings, there is no single "right" type of structure-preserving function between metric spaces. Instead, one works with different types of functions depending on one's goals. The words "function" and "map" are used interchangeably.

Isometries

One interpretation of a "structure-preserving" map is one that fully preserves the distance function:
It follows from the metric space axioms that a distance-preserving function is injective.  A bijective distance-preserving function is called an isometry.  One perhaps non-obvious example of an isometry between spaces described in this article is the map  defined by

Metric spaces that are isometric are essentially identical.

Continuous maps

On the other end of the spectrum, one can forget entirely about the metric structure and study continuous maps, which only preserve topological structure.  There are several equivalent definitions of continuity for metric spaces.  The most important are:
 Topological definition.
 Sequential continuity.
 (These first two definitions are not equivalent for all topological spaces.)
 ε–δ definition.
Homeomorphic spaces are the same from the point of view of topology, but may have very different metric properties. For example,  is unbounded and complete, while  is bounded but not complete.

Uniformly continuous maps

The only difference between this definition and the ε–δ definition of continuity is the order of quantifiers: the choice of δ must depend only on ε and not on the point . However, this subtle change makes a big difference. In other words, uniform continuity preserves some metric properties which are not purely topological.

On the other hand, the Heine–Cantor theorem states that if  is compact, then every continuous map is uniformly continuous.  In other words, uniform continuity cannot distinguish any non-topological features of compact metric spaces.

Lipschitz maps and contractions

A Lipschitz map is one that stretches distances by at most a bounded factor.  Formally, given a real number , the map  is -Lipschitz if

Lipschitz maps are particularly important in metric geometry, since they provide more flexibility than distance-preserving maps, but still make essential use of the metric.  For example, a curve in a metric space is rectifiable (has finite length) if and only if it has a Lipschitz reparametrization.

A 1-Lipschitz map is sometimes called a nonexpanding or metric map.  Metric maps are commonly taken to be the morphisms of the category of metric spaces.

The Banach fixed-point theorem states that if  is a complete metric space, then every contraction  admits a unique fixed point. If the metric space  is compact, the result holds for a slightly weaker condition on : a map  admits a unique fixed point if

Quasi-isometries

A quasi-isometry is a map that preserves the "large-scale structure" of a metric space.  Quasi-isometries need not be continuous.  For example,  and its subspace  are quasi-isometric, even though one is connected and the other is discrete.  The equivalence relation of quasi-isometry is important in geometric group theory: the Švarc–Milnor lemma states that all spaces on which a group acts geometrically are quasi-isometric.

Formally, the map  is a quasi-isometric embedding if there exist constants  and  such that

Notions of metric space equivalence

Given two metric spaces  and :
They are called homeomorphic (topologically isomorphic) if there is a homeomorphism between them (i.e., a continuous bijection with a continuous inverse).
They are called uniformic (uniformly isomorphic) if there is a uniform isomorphism between them (i.e., a uniformly continuous bijection with a uniformly continuous inverse).
They are called bilipschitz homeomorphic if there is a bilipschitz bijection between them (i.e., a Lipschitz bijection with a Lipschitz inverse).
They are called isometric if there is a (bijective) isometry between them. In this case, the two metric spaces are essentially identical.
They are called quasi-isometric if there is a quasi-isometry between them.

Metric spaces with additional structure

Normed vector spaces 

A normed vector space is a vector space equipped with a norm, which is a function that measures the length of vectors.

The metric  is said to be induced by the norm .  Conversely, if a metric  on a vector space  is
then it is the metric induced by the norm

A similar relationship holds between seminorms and pseudometrics.

More generally, the Kuratowski embedding allows one to see any metric space as a subspace of a normed vector space.

Infinite-dimensional normed vector spaces, particularly spaces of functions, are studied in functional analysis.  Completeness is particularly important in this context: a complete normed vector space is known as a Banach space.  An unusual property of normed vector spaces is that linear transformations between them are continuous if and only if they are Lipschitz.  Such transformations are known as bounded operators.

Length spaces 

A curve in a metric space  is a continuous function .

In general, this supremum may be infinite; a curve of finite length is called rectifiable.  Suppose that the length of the curve  is equal to the distance between its endpoints—that is, it's the shortest possible path between its endpoints.  After reparametrization by arc length,  becomes a geodesic: a curve which is a distance-preserving function.  A geodesic is a shortest possible path between any two of its points.

A geodesic metric space is a metric space which admits a geodesic between any two of its points.

Unlike in a geodesic metric space, the infimum does not have to be attained. An example of a length space which is not geodesic is the Euclidean plane minus the origin: the points  and  can be joined by paths of length arbitrarily close to 2, but not by a path of length 2. An example of a metric space which is not a length space is given by the straight-line metric on the sphere: the straight line between two points through the center of the earth is shorter than any path along the surface.

For instance, if  is the straight-line distance on the sphere, then  is the great-circle distance. However, in some cases  may have infinite values.

Riemannian manifolds 

A Riemannian manifold is a space equipped with a Riemannian metric tensor, which determines lengths of tangent vectors at every point.  This can be thought of defining a notion of distance infinitesimally.  In particular, a differentiable path  in a Riemannian manifold  has length defined as the integral of the length of the tangent vector to the path:

On a connected Riemannian manifold, one then defines the distance between two points as the infimum of lengths of smooth paths between them.  This construction generalizes to other kinds of infinitesimal metrics on manifolds, such as sub-Riemannian and Finsler metrics.

The Riemannian metric is uniquely determined by the distance function; this means that in principle, all information about a Riemannian manifold can be recovered from its distance function. One direction in metric geometry is finding purely metric ("synthetic") formulations of properties of Riemannian manifolds. Thus  spaces generalize upper curvature bounds to general metric spaces.

Metric measure spaces 

Therefore, generalizations of many ideas from analysis naturally reside in metric measure spaces: spaces that have both a measure and a metric which are compatible with each other. Formally, a metric measure space is a metric space equipped with a Borel regular measure such that every ball has positive measure. For example Euclidean spaces of dimension , and more generally -dimensional Riemannian manifolds, naturally have the structure of a metric measure space, equipped with the Lebesgue measure. Certain fractal metric spaces such as the Sierpiński gasket can be equipped with the α-dimensional Hausdorff measure where α is the Hausdorff dimension. In general, however, a metric space may not have an "obvious" choice of measure.

One application of metric measure spaces is generalizing the notion of Ricci curvature beyond Riemannian manifolds.

Further examples and applications

Graphs and finite metric spaces 
A  if its induced topology is the discrete topology.  Although many concepts, such as completeness and compactness, are not interesting for such spaces, they are nevertheless an object of study in several branches of mathematics.  In particular,  (those having a finite number of points) are studied in combinatorics and theoretical computer science.  Embeddings in other metric spaces are particularly well-studied.  For example, not every finite metric space can be isometrically embedded in a Euclidean space or in Hilbert space.  On the other hand, in the worst case the required distortion (bilipschitz constant) is only logarithmic in the number of points.

This is also called shortest-path distance or geodesic distance. In geometric group theory this construction is applied to the Cayley graph of a (typically infinite) finitely-generated group, yielding the word metric. Up to a bilipschitz homeomorphism, the word metric depends only on the group and not on the chosen finite generating set.

Distances between mathematical objects 
In modern mathematics, one often studies spaces whose points are themselves mathematical objects.  A distance function on such a space generally aims to measure the dissimilarity between two objects.  Here are some examples:
 Functions to a metric space.
 String metrics and edit distances. There are many ways of measuring distances between strings of characters, which may represent sentences in computational linguistics or code words in coding theory.  Edit distances attempt to measure the number of changes necessary to get from one string to another.  For example, the Hamming distance measures the minimal number of substitutions needed, while the Levenshtein distance measures the minimal number of deletions, insertions, and substitutions; both of these can be thought of as distances in an appropriate graph.
 Graph edit distance is a measure of dissimilarity between two graphs, defined as the minimal number of graph edit operations required to transform one graph into another.
 Wasserstein metrics measure the distance between two measures on the same metric space.  The Wasserstein distance between two measures is, roughly speaking, the cost of transporting one to the other.
 The set of all  by  matrices over some field is a metric space with respect to the rank distance .
 The Helly metric in game theory measures the difference between strategies in a game.

Hausdorff and Gromov–Hausdorff distance 
The idea of spaces of mathematical objects can also be applied to subsets of a metric space, as well as metric spaces themselves. Hausdorff and Gromov–Hausdorff distance define metrics on the set of compact subsets of a metric space and the set of compact metric spaces, respectively.

However, since there may not be a single closest point, it is defined via an infimum:

Furthermore, distances between points and sets satisfy a version of the triangle inequality:

Incidentally, this shows that metric spaces are completely regular.

For example, if  is an open set in Euclidean space  is an ε-net inside , then . In general, the Hausdorff distance  can be infinite or zero. However, the Hausdorff distance between two distinct compact sets is always positive and finite.

The Gromov–Hausdorff metric defines a distance between (isometry classes of) compact metric spaces. While the exact value of the Gromov–Hausdorff distance is rarely useful to know, the resulting topology has found many applications.

Miscellaneous examples  
 The tight span of a metric space is another metric space which can be thought of as an abstract version of the convex hull.
 The Robinson–Foulds metric used for calculating the distances between Phylogenetic trees in Phylogenetics

Constructions

Product metric spaces

and the induced topology agrees with the product topology.  By the equivalence of norms in finite dimensions, a topologically equivalent metric is obtained if  is the taxicab norm, a p-norm, the maximum norm, or any other norm which is non-decreasing as the coordinates of a positive -tuple increase (yielding the triangle inequality).

Similarly, a metric on the topological product of countably many metric spaces can be obtained using the metric

The topological product of uncountably many metric spaces need not be metrizable.

Quotient metric spaces

In general this will only define a pseudometric, i.e.  does not necessarily imply that . However, for some equivalence relations (e.g., those given by gluing together polyhedra along faces),  is a metric.

The quotient metric  is characterized by the following universal property.

The quotient metric does not always induce the quotient topology.  For example, the topological quotient of the metric space  identifying all points of the form  is not metrizable since it is not first-countable, but the quotient metric is a well-defined metric on the same set which induces a coarser topology.  Moreover, different metrics on the original topological space (a disjoint union of countably many intervals) lead to different topologies on the quotient.

A topological space is sequential if and only if it is a (topological) quotient of a metric space.

Generalizations of metric spaces

There are several notions of spaces which have less structure than a metric space, but more than a topological space.
 Uniform spaces are spaces in which distances are not defined, but uniform continuity is.
 Approach spaces are spaces in which point-to-set distances are defined, instead of point-to-point distances.  They have particularly good properties from the point of view of category theory.
 Continuity spaces are a generalization of metric spaces and posets that can be used to unify the notions of metric spaces and domains.

There are also numerous ways of relaxing the axioms for a metric, giving rise to various notions of generalized metric spaces. These generalizations can also be combined. The terminology used to describe them is not completely standardized. Most notably, in functional analysis pseudometrics often come from seminorms on vector spaces, and so it is natural to call them "semimetrics". This conflicts with the use of the term in topology.

Extended metrics 
Some authors define metrics so as to allow the distance function  to attain the value ∞, i.e. distances are non-negative numbers on the extended real number line. Such a function is also called an extended metric or "∞-metric". Every extended metric can be replaced by a finite metric which is topologically equivalent.

Metrics valued in structures other than the real numbers 
The requirement that the metric take values in  can be relaxed to consider metrics with values in other structures, including:
 Ordered fields, yielding the notion of a generalised metric.
 More general directed sets.  In the absence of an addition operation, the triangle inequality does not make sense and is replaced with an ultrametric inequality.  This leads to the notion of a generalized ultrametric.
These generalizations still induce a uniform structure on the space.

Pseudometrics

In other words, the axioms for a pseudometric are:

 
 
 
 .

In some contexts, pseudometrics are referred to as semimetrics because of their relation to seminorms.

Quasimetrics
Occasionally, a quasimetric is defined as a function that satisfies all axioms for a metric with the possible exception of symmetry. The name of this generalisation is not entirely standardized.

 
 
 

Quasimetrics are common in real life. For example, given a set  of mountain villages, the typical walking times between elements of  form a quasimetric because travel uphill takes longer than travel downhill.

A quasimetric on the reals can be defined by setting

This quasimetric describes the cost of modifying a metal stick: it is easy to reduce its size by filing it down, but it is difficult or impossible to grow it.

For example, the topology induced by the quasimetric on the reals described above is the (reversed) Sorgenfrey line.

Metametrics or partial metrics

In a metametric, all the axioms of a metric are satisfied except that the distance between identical points is not necessarily zero. In other words, the axioms for a metametric are:

 
 
 
 

Metametrics appear in the study of Gromov hyperbolic metric spaces and their boundaries. Metametrics were first defined by Jussi Väisälä. In other work, a function satisfying these axioms is called a partial metric or a dislocated metric.

Semimetrics

 
 
 

Some authors work with a weaker form of the triangle inequality, such as:

{|
|
|ρ-relaxed triangle inequality
|-
|
|ρ-inframetric inequality
|}

The ρ-inframetric inequality implies the ρ-relaxed triangle inequality (assuming the first axiom), and the ρ-relaxed triangle inequality implies the 2ρ-inframetric inequality. Semimetrics satisfying these equivalent conditions have sometimes been referred to as quasimetrics, nearmetrics or inframetrics.

The ρ-inframetric inequalities were introduced to model round-trip delay times in the internet. The triangle inequality implies the 2-inframetric inequality, and the ultrametric inequality is exactly the 1-inframetric inequality.

Premetrics
Relaxing the last three axioms leads to the notion of a premetric, i.e. a function satisfying the following conditions:

 
 

This is not a standard term. Sometimes it is used to refer to other generalizations of metrics such as pseudosemimetrics or pseudometrics; in translations of Russian books it sometimes appears as "prametric". A premetric that satisfies symmetry, i.e. a pseudosemimetric, is also called a distance.

Any premetric gives rise to a topology as follows. For a positive real , the  centered at a point  is defined as

Every premetric space is a topological space, and in fact a sequential space.
In general, the  themselves need not be open sets with respect to this topology. 

This defines a premetric on the power set of a premetric space. If we start with a (pseudosemi-)metric space, we get a pseudosemimetric, i.e. a symmetric premetric.
Any premetric gives rise to a preclosure operator  as follows:

Pseudoquasimetrics
The prefixes pseudo-, quasi- and semi- can also be combined, e.g., a pseudoquasimetric (sometimes called hemimetric) relaxes both the indiscernibility axiom and the symmetry axiom and is simply a premetric satisfying the triangle inequality. For pseudoquasimetric spaces the open  form a basis of open sets.

Sets equipped with an extended pseudoquasimetric were studied by William Lawvere as "generalized metric spaces". From a categorical point of view, the extended pseudometric spaces and the extended pseudoquasimetric spaces, along with their corresponding nonexpansive maps, are the best behaved of the metric space categories. One can take arbitrary products and coproducts and form quotient objects within the given category. If one drops "extended", one can only take finite products and coproducts. If one drops "pseudo", one cannot take quotients.

Lawvere also gave an alternate definition of such spaces as enriched categories.  The ordered set  can be seen as a category with one morphism  if  and none otherwise. Using  as the tensor product and 0 as the identity makes this category into a monoidal category .
Every (extended pseudoquasi-)metric space  can now be viewed as a category  enriched over :
 The triangle inequality and the fact that  for all points  derive from the properties of composition and identity in an enriched category.
 Since  is a poset, all diagrams that are required for an enriched category commute automatically.

Metrics on multisets
The notion of a metric can be generalized from a distance between two elements to a number assigned to a multiset of elements. A multiset is a generalization of the notion of a set in which an element can occur more than once. A function  on the set of nonempty finite multisets of elements of a set  is a metric if
  depends only on the (unordered) multiset  (symmetry)
  (triangle inequality)
That is, every multiset metric yields an ordinary metric when restricted to sets of two elements.

More complex examples are information distance in multisets; and normalized compression distance (NCD) in multisets.

See also

Notes

Citations

References

External links 
 
 Far and near—several examples of distance functions at cut-the-knot.

 
Mathematical analysis
Mathematical structures
Topology
Topological spaces
Uniform spaces